Angelika Schädler (born 29 April 1980) is a retired tennis player from Liechtenstein.

Representing Liechtenstein, Schädler has an overall record of 7–15 in Fed Cup competition.

Fed Cup participation

Singles

Doubles

External links 
 
 

1980 births
Living people
Liechtenstein female tennis players